Pempeliella ornatella is a moth of the family Pyralidae described by Michael Denis and Ignaz Schiffermüller in 1775. It is found in most of Europe, east to the Ural, Siberia, central Yakutia and Kyrghyzstan.

Adults are on wing from mid-June to August in one generation.

The larvae live in a web near the roots of  Thymus species.

Subspecies
Pempeliella ornatella ornatella
Pempeliella ornatella gigantella

References

Pempeliella ornatella ([Denis & Schiffermüller], 1775) at Catalogue of the Lepidoptera of Belgium
Pempeliella ornatella (Denis & Schiffermüller, 1775) at Fauna Europaea
Pyraliodea collection of Siberian Zoological Museum as Pempelliella ornatella

Moths described in 1775
Phycitini
Moths of Europe
Moths of Asia